This is a timeline documenting events of Jazz in the year 1941.

Events
Cab Calloway is struck by a spitball during a concert in Hartford, Connecticut. He then fights Dizzy Gillespie. Dizzy is consequently fired.

Standards

Deaths

 February
 24 – David Plunket Greene, English musician, Bright Young Things (suicide) (born 1904).

 March
 8 – Ken Snakehips Johnson, band leader and dancer, originally from British Guiana (born 1914).
 9 – Casper Reardon, American harpist (born 1907).

 July
 10 – Jelly Roll Morton, American pianist, bandleader and composer (born 1890).

 September
 1 – Frank Melrose, American pianist (born 1907).

 October
 25 – Nisse Lind, Swedish accordionist and pianist (born 1904).
 30 – Chu Berry, American tenor saxophonist (born 1908).

 November
 24 – Dick Wilson, American tenor saxophonist (born 1911).

 Unknown date
 Steve Lewis, New Orleans pianist and composer (born 1896).

Births

 January
 3 – Roger Neumann, American saxophonist, flutist, and composer (died 2018).
 12 – Olu Dara, American cornetist, guitarist and singer.
 13 – Frankie Armstrong, English singer and voice teacher, Feminist Improvising Group.
 15 – Captain Beefheart, American singer (died 2010).
 16 – Aldo Romano, Italian  drummer.
 19
 Putter Smith, American bassist.
 R. Winston Morris, American tubist.
 27 – Bobby Hutcherson, American vibraphone and marimba player (died 2016).

 February
 5 – Rick Laird, American bassist (died 2021).
 6 – Palle Mikkelborg, Danish trumpeter.
 11
 Louis Banks, Indian keyboardist, singer composer, and record producer.
 Sérgio Mendes, Brazilian musician.
 16 – Jim Richardson, British bassist and session musician.
 17 – Herbie Lewis, American upright bassist (died 2007).
 18 – Lajos Dudas, German-Hungarian clarinetist and composer.
 23 – Barry Martyn, English born drummer and bandleader.

 March
 4 – Bobby Shew, American trumpet and flugelhorn player.
 6 – Peter Brötzmann, German saxophonist and clarinetist.
 8 – Franco D'Andrea, Italian pianist and composer.
 22 – Hugo Rasmussen, Danish upright bassist (died 2015).
 23 – Carola Standertskjöld, Finnish singer (died 1997).
 28 – Meredith D'Ambrosio, American singer.

 April
 5 – Michael Moriarty, American-Canadian actor and musician.
 17 – John C. Marshall, British guitarist, vocalist, and songwriter (died 2012).
 21
 Alfred "Pee Wee" Ellis, American saxophonist, composer, and arranger.
 Fredrik Norén, Swedish drummer (died 2016).
 22 – Don Grusin, American songwriter, producer, and keyboardist.
 25 – Harry Miller, South African upright bassist (died 1983).
 28 – Mickey Tucker, American pianist and organist.

 May
 2
 Connie Crothers, American pianist (died 2016).
 Eddy Louiss, French Hammon organist and singer (died 2015).
 5 – Stanley Cowell, American pianist and founder of Strata-East Records.
 7 – Lars Sjösten, Swedish pianist and composer (died 2011).
 8 – Cornel Chiriac, Romanian journalist, producer, and drummer (died 1975).
 11 – Eric Burdon, English singer.
 12 – Trevor Tomkins, English drummer.
 13
 John Von Ohlen, American drummer, Blue Wisp Big Band (died 2018).
 Miles Kington, British journalist, musician, and broadcaster (died 2008).
 20 – Gia Maione, American singer (died 2013).
 24 – Charles Earland, American composer, organist, and saxophonist (died 1999).
 27 – Teppo Hauta-aho, Finnish upright bassist and composer.

 June
 2
 Charlie Watts, English drummer, The Rolling Stones.
 Irène Schweizer, Swiss pianist, Feminist Improvising Group.
 3 – Janusz Muniak, Polish saxophonist, flautist, arranger, and composer (died 2016).
 11 – Bernard Purdie, American drummer.
 12 – Chick Corea, American pianist, keyboardist, and composer.
 18 – Jim Pepper, American saxophonist and singer (died 1992).
 25 – David T. Walker, American guitarist.
 26 – Wayne Dockery, American upright bassist (died 2018).

 July
 1 – Robertinho Silva, Brazilian drummer.
 18 – Pete Yellin, American saxophonist and educator (died 2016).
 19 – Phil Upchurch, American guitarist and bassist.
 24 – Bobby Matos, American percussionist.
 28 – Jim Riggs, American saxophonist.

 August
 5
 Airto Moreira, Brazilian drummer and percussionist.
 Lenny Breau, American guitarist and music educator (died 1984).
 6 – Svein Christiansen, Norwegian drummer (died 2015).
 7 – Howard Johnson, American tubist and saxophonist.
 15 – Eddie Gale, American trumpeter.
 20 – Milford Graves, American drummer and percussionist.
 21 – Tom Coster, American keyboardist and composer.
 26 – Clifford Jarvis, American drummer (died 1999).
 27
 Anders Linder, Swedish actor and musician.
 Cesária Évora, Cape Verdean singer (died 2011).
 28 – John Marshall, English drummer, Nucleus.
 30 – Carmen Fanzone, American horn players.

 September
 8 – Phillip Wilson, American percussionist (died 1992).
 13 - Knut Kiesewetter, German musician, singer, and songwriter (died 2016).
 20 – Jim Cullum Jr., American cornetist (died 2019).
 23 – Norma Winstone, British singer and lyricist.
 26 – Terry Rosen, American jazz guitarist, concert promoter, and radio DJ. (died 1999).
 27 – Uli Trepte, German bassist (died 2009).
 28 – Mike Osborne, English alto saxophonist, pianist, and clarinetist (died 2007).

 October
 1 – LaMont Johnson, American pianist (died 1999).
 6 – Masahiko Satoh, Japanese pianist, composer, and arranger.
 9 – Chucho Valdés, Cuban pianist, bandleader, and composer.
 11 – Lester Bowie, American trumpet player and composer (died 1999).
 19 – Eddie Daniels, American clarinetist, saxophonist, and composer.
 28
 Glen Moore, American bassist.
 Hank Marvin, English guitarist, multi-instrumentalist, singer, and songwriter.
 Jay Clayton, American vocalist and jazz educator.

 November
 7 – Gary Windo, American tenor saxophonist (died 1992).
 22 – Ron McClure, American bassist.
 25 – Eleni Karaindrou, Greek pianist and composer.
 28
 Adelhard Roidinger, Austrian bassist, electronic musician, composer, and computer graphic designer.
 Jesper Thilo, Danish tenor saxophonist, alto saxophonist, and clarinetist.

 December
 2 – P. J. Perry, Canadian saxophonist.
 19 – Franco Ambrosetti, Swiss trumpeter, flugelhornist and composer.
 11 – Rogier van Otterloo, Dutch composer and conductor (died 1988).
 12
 Gary Barone, American trumpeter and flugelhornist (died 2019).
 Tim Hauser, American singer (died 2014).
 18 – Wadada Leo Smith, American trumpeter and composer.
 19
 Don Weller, British tenor saxophonist and composer (died 2020).
 Maurice White, American singer-songwriter, musician, record producer, and bandleader, Earth, Wind & Fire (died 2016).
 21 – John Hicks, American pianist and composer (died 2006).
 25
 Don Pullen, American pianist and organist (died 1995).
 Ronnie Cuber, American saxophonist.
 29 – Ray Thomas, British flautist and singer, The Moody Blues (died 2018).
 31 – Elisa Gabbai, German-singing Israeli singer (died 2010).

 Unknown date
 Annette Peacock, American composer, singer, songwriter, producer, arranger, and musician.
 Jonas Gwangwa, South African trombone player.
 Lowell Davidson, American pianist (died 1990).

See also
 1940s in jazz
 List of years in jazz
 1941 in music

References

Bibliography

External links 
 History Of Jazz Timeline: 1941 at All About Jazz

Jazz
Jazz by year